Muhammad Yar Chishti (Urdu: محمد يار چشتي) is a village in Tehsil Depalpur, District Okara, Pakistan. It is right on the outskirts of Haveli Lakha, a small city. It produces a wide variety of agricultural products, including potatoes, sugar canes, cotton, wheat, corn, rice, lentils etc. Some of the houses are made of adobe and some are of bricks. It has a masjid that is large and spacious from inside.

References

Okara District